János Rózsa (born 19 October 1937) is a Hungarian film director and producer. He has directed 21 films since 1961. His 1987 film Love, Mother was entered into the 15th Moscow International Film Festival.

Selected filmography
 Love, Mother (1987)
 Brats (1991)
 Summer Love (2001)
 Relatives (2006)

References

External links

1937 births
Living people
Hungarian film directors
Hungarian film producers
Film people from Budapest